Asociația Supporter Club Oțelul Galați is a professional association football club based in Galați, Romania. The club was founded in 1964.

Oțelul Galați played their first top league fixture on 17 August 1986 against Victoria București. Since that game they have played in 894 first league matches and have faced 60 different sides. Their most regular opponents have been Dinamo București, whom they have played against on 54 occasions. The club has won 22 of the league matches against SR Brașov which represents the most Oțelul have won against any team. They have drawn more matches with Argeș Pitești than with any other club, with 11 of their meetings finishing without a winner. Dinamo București are the side that has defeated Oțelul in more league games than any other club, having won 34 of their encounters.

Key
 The table includes results of matches played by Oțelul Galați in Liga I.
   Clubs with this background and symbol in the "Club" column are defunct
 The name used for each opponent is the name they had when Oțelul Galați most recently played a league match against them. Results against each opponent include results against that club under any former name. For example, results against Universitatea Cluj include matches played against Știința Cluj.
 P = matches played; W = matches won; D = matches drawn; L = matches lost; F = goals for; A = goals against; Win% = percentage of total matches won
 The columns headed "First" and "Last" contain the first and most recent seasons in which Oțelul Galați played league matches against each opponent

All-time league record
Statistics correct as of matches played on season 2016–17.

References

General
 
 

ASC Oțelul Galați
Romanian football club league records by opponent